The Holy Spirit Cathedral (also Jataí Cathedral or more formally Cathedral of the Divine Holy Spirit) is a Catholic church and a symbol and monument of the city of Jataí, in the state of Goiás, Brazil.

The Jataí cathedral draws attention for its grandeur and modern architecture. The building was begun in 1984, and the work took nine years to complete. It was dedicated on October 2, 1993, to the Holy Spirit, with the presence of the then Apostolic Nuncio in Brazil, Archbishop Alfio Rapisarda. Viewed from above, the church resembles the shape of a honeycomb. Its facade has twelve columns that symbolize the apostles of Christ.

Inside, it has an immense panel of sacred art, painted by the famous artist , with paintings representing important passages of the Old and New Testaments. It also has a crypt where the bishops are buried.

See also
Roman Catholicism in Brazil
Holy Spirit Cathedral

References

Roman Catholic cathedrals in Goiás
Roman Catholic churches in Goiás
Roman Catholic churches completed in 1993
20th-century Roman Catholic church buildings in Brazil